Albert Edward Stitfall (7 July 1924 – 1998) was a Welsh professional footballer.

Career

Stitfall was born in Cardiff, and joined his hometown side Cardiff City during the Second World War, later serving in the Royal Navy. On his return to Britain he continued to play for Cardiff, although never managing to establish himself in the first team. While at the club he also played alongside both of his brothers, Ron Stitfall would go on to become one of the club's all-time greats, making over 400 appearances, while Bob Stitfall would only ever go as far as the reserve side.

He left the club in 1952 to sign for Torquay United and, despite playing in nearly half of the club's games that season, he left the club at the end of the season never returning to league football.

References

1924 births
1998 deaths
Welsh footballers
Footballers from Cardiff
Cardiff City F.C. players
Torquay United F.C. players
English Football League players
Association football defenders
Royal Navy personnel of World War II